Geoffrey James Wilson (born 5 November 1952) is a former Australian politician.

Early life and career
Born in Culcairn in New South Wales, he was a barrister and union official before entering the Legislative Assembly.

Member of parliament
In 1998, he was elected to the Legislative Assembly of Queensland as the Labor member for Ferny Grove, which he represented until 2012.

From January 2002 until October 2006 he Chaired the Parliamentary Crime and Misconduct Committee.

Government Minister
He was appointed Minister for Mines and Energy in September 2006 by Peter Beattie, and continued in that post after Anna Bligh took over as Premier a year later.

Following the 2009 election, he was named Minister for Education and Training. In the February 2011 reshuffle, he was appointed Minister for Health. He served in that post until Labor's loss at 2012 election, in which Wilson lost his seat to the LNP.

References

1952 births
Living people
People from Culcairn
Members of the Queensland Legislative Assembly
Australian Labor Party members of the Parliament of Queensland
21st-century Australian politicians